The ATP Challenger China International – Nanchang is a tennis tournament held in Nanchang, China since 2014. The event is part of the ATP Challenger Tour and since 2018 is played on indoor clay courts. Until 2016, the event has been held on hard courts at the Jiangxi International Sports Center.

Past finals

Singles

Doubles

 
ATP Challenger Tour
Tennis tournaments in China
Hard court tennis tournaments